Vaggampalli is a village in Pamur mandal, located in Prakasam district of the Indian state of Andhra Pradesh.

References 

Villages in Prakasam district